The 2012–13 season is PAS Hamedan's 2nd season in the Azadegan League. The team was managed by Vinko Begović and captained by Mohammad Alavi. Vinko Begović was replaced with Omid Tayeri in the middle of the season.

First-team squad
as of September 8, 2012

Transfers

Summer 

In:

Out:
c

Competitions

Results summary

Results by round

Standings

Matches

Play-off

Round 1

Round 2

Statistics

Top scorers
Includes all competitive matches. The list is sorted by shirt number when total goals are equal.

Last updated on 26 June 2013

Squad statistics

Statistics accurate as of 26 June 2013

See also
 2012–13 Azadegan League
 2012–13 Hazfi Cup

References

PAS Hamedan F.C. seasons
Pas Hamedan